Are You Ready for This? is a studio album by jazz drummers Buddy Rich and Louie Bellson, recorded in Japan together with the George Kawaguchi Big Band.  Album cover art is by Jack Lonshein.

This recording of "Slides and Hides" includes 22 minutes of soloing by the two drummers and was also included as side 4 of the 1979 European double-LP compilation album, Louis Bellson, With Bells On!

Track listing
LP side A 
"Slides and Hides Part 1"
LP side B
"Slides and Hides Part 2" 
arrangement: Benny Carter

Personnel 
 Louie Bellson – drums
 Buddy Rich – drums
Blue Mitchell – trumpet
Junior Cook – tenor saxophone
Gene Taylor – acoustic bass
Toshiko Mariano (Toshiko Akiyoshi) – piano
The George Kawaguchi Big Band

References 

Roost RST 2263 
Roulette 2432 003

Roost Records albums
Buddy Rich albums
Louie Bellson albums
1965 albums
Roulette Records albums
Albums arranged by Benny Carter